Lord Frederick Montagu (8 November 1774 – 4 October 1827) was a British politician. He was Postmaster General between 1826 and 1827.

Background
Montagu was a younger son of George Montagu, 4th Duke of Manchester, and Elizabeth, daughter of Sir James Dashwood, 2nd Baronet. William Montagu, 5th Duke of Manchester, was his elder brother. He was educated at Harrow School.

Political career
Montagu sat as Member of Parliament for Huntingdonshire between 1796 and 1806 and between 1818 and 1820. He served under the Earl of Liverpool as Postmaster General between 1826 and 1827.

Personal life
Montagu died unmarried in October 1827, aged 52.

References

External links 
 

1774 births
1827 deaths
Younger sons of dukes
People educated at Harrow School
Members of the Parliament of Great Britain for English constituencies
British MPs 1796–1800
Members of the Parliament of the United Kingdom for English constituencies
UK MPs 1801–1802
UK MPs 1802–1806
UK MPs 1818–1820
United Kingdom Postmasters General
Frederick